Kellon Baptiste (7 September 1973 – 12 April 2012) was a Grenadian international footballer who played as a goalkeeper.

Career
Baptiste played club football in Grenada for GBSS Demerara Mutual, and he also had a spell with the St. Louis Steamers in the United States.

Baptiste made his international debut in 1991, and appeared in eight FIFA World Cup qualifying matches.

He died of cancer in Saint George, Grenada.

References

1973 births
2012 deaths
Grenadian footballers
Grenada international footballers
Deaths from cancer in Grenada
Association football goalkeepers